Zmaj is the Serbian spelling of the Slavic dragon. The term may also refer to:

People
Zmaj od Avale: Vasa Čarapić, Serbian revolutionary
Zmaj od Noćaja: Stojan Čupić, Serbian revolutionary
Zmaj od Radana: Ivan Kosančić, Serbian knight
Zmaj ognjeni Vuk: Vuk Grgurević, Serbian despot
Jovan Jovanović Zmaj, Serbian poet

Places
Kolonija Zmaj, Belgrade

Sport
HNK Zmaj Makarska, Croatia
BŠK Zmaj, Croatia

Other
Zmaj aircraft, Yugoslav aircraft manufacturer
IPM Zmaj, Serbian company
Zmaj od Noćaja (album)
Zmaj (album)
Yugoslav minelayer Zmaj
Zmaj Children Games